Suzanne Newcombe researches the modern history of yoga, new and minority religions and is particularly interested in "the interfaces between religion, health and healing." She is known in particular for her work on yoga for women and yoga in Britain.

Early life and education

Suzanne Newcombe grew up in Kansas. She studied religion at Amherst College in Massachusetts with a year at SOAS in London. She took a master's degree in Religion in Contemporary Society at the London School of Economics. She obtained her PhD at the University of Cambridge on the popularisation of yoga and ayurvedic medicine in Britain.

Career

Newcombe is a senior lecturer at the Open University, working on the sociology and social history of modern and contemporary religion, publishing partiuclarly in the areas of modern yoga and Ayurveda. She edits and helped to found the Journal of Yoga Studies, and the "Modern Yoga Research" website. She was a researcher on the European Research Council funded AYURYOG: Entangled Histories of Yoga, Ayurveda and Alchemy in South Asia project which ran from 2015-2020. Newcombe has appeared on BBC radio and television to discuss modern yoga and religious practices.

Since 2020, she has been the honorary director of INFORM based in Theology and Religious Studies at Kings College London.

Newcome appeared on ABC News 20/20's broadcast on the subject of the Heaven's Gate Cult and spoke that everyone is potentially susceptible to joining a cult stating that "No one ever joins a Cult".

Reception

Susan J. Palmer, reviewing Prophecy in the New Millennium for the Review of Religious Research, called the book "a rich and ground-breaking study that should stimulate a fresh interest in this enigmatic phenomenon."

Benjamin D. Crace, reviewing Prophecy in the New Millennium for Nova Religio, describes it as "a concise introduction to prophecy, its history, current role, and trajectory" that explores why prophecy "continues to persist as modernity fails and the world becomes increasingly interconnected." Crace notes that "some readers will find the narratives more readable and interesting" than the scholarly analysis.

Christopher Patrick Miller described Yoga in Britain for Religions of South Asia as a "detailed and well-researched analysis of the most significant forms of yoga that developed in Britain during the twentieth century... (providing) scholars and yoga practitioners with an original, detailed, and yet easy-to-read history of the development of yoga theory and praxis as it interfaced with twentieth-century Britain."

Susannah Crockford, reviewing the Routledge Handbook of Yoga and Meditaiton Studies for Nova Religio, writes that "The editors bring together an admirable breadth and depth of knowledge on yoga, and for that alone, this is an essential resource for anyone interested in yoga studies."

Works

 2013 Prophecy in the New Millennium: When Prophecies Persist, Routledge (edited, with Sarah Harvey) 
 2017 The Revival of Yoga in Contemporary India Oxford Research Encyclopedias
 2019 Yoga in Britain: Stretching Spirituality and Educating Yogis, Equinox 
 2021  ed. with Karen O’Brien-Kop. Routledge Handbook of Yoga and Meditation Studies. Routledge.

See also 

 Yoga in Britain, the focus of Newcombe's research

References 

Yoga scholars
Living people
Year of birth missing (living people)